Protein phosphatase Slingshot homolog 2 is an enzyme that in humans is encoded by the SSH2 gene.

The ADF (actin-depolymerizing factor)/cofilin family (see MIM 601442) is composed of stimulus-responsive mediators of actin dynamics. ADF/cofilin proteins are inactivated by kinases such as LIM domain kinase-1 (LIMK1; MIM 601329). The SSH family appears to play a role in actin dynamics by reactivating ADF/cofilin proteins in vivo (Niwa et al., 2002).[supplied by OMIM]

References

Further reading

External links